James P. Timilty (March 28, 1865 – July 6, 1921) was an American politician.

Timilty was born in Boston, Massachusetts. He went to the Boston public schools. He worked for the Boston City Paving Department and was a foreman. Timilty lived in Roxbury. In 1908 and 1909, Timilty served on the Boston Board of Aldermen and was a Democrat. He served in the Massachusetts Senate from 1910 to 1916. Timilty died at his summer home in Sharon, Massachusetts after being in poor health for several years.

See also
 1913 Massachusetts legislature
 1915 Massachusetts legislature
 1916 Massachusetts legislature
 1917 Massachusetts legislature

Notes

1865 births
1921 deaths
Politicians from Boston
Boston Board of Aldermen members
Democratic Party Massachusetts state senators
Timilty family